Netherlands competed at the 1980 Summer Paralympics in Arnhem, Netherlands. The team included 108 athletes, 78 men, 26 women & 4 mixed (Unknown gender, participant of a mixed gender event). Competitors from Netherlands won 100 medals, including 33 gold, 31 silver and 36 bronze to finish 6th in the medal table.

See also
Netherlands at the Paralympics
Netherlands at the 1980 Summer Olympics

References 

Nations at the 1980 Summer Paralympics
1980
Summer Paralympics